Adam Young may refer to:

Real people

Musicians
 Adam Young (born 1986), the founder and only constant member of Owl City, among other projects
 Adam Young, the former leader of the grindcore band Sockweb
 Adam Young (Canadian musician) (born 1980), Canadian musician, see 17th Canadian Folk Music Awards

Other people
 Adam Young (politician), a former member of the West Virginia House of Delegates
 Adam Young, the founder of Adam Young Inc., and Young Broadcasting

Fictional characters
 Adam Young, a fictional child prodigy on the television show Mr. Young
 Adam Young, the innocent Anti-Christ in the novel Good Omens